"Love Theme from The Godfather" is an instrumental theme from the 1972 film The Godfather, composed by Nino Rota. The piece was lyricized in English by Larry Kusik into "Speak Softly, Love", a popular song released in 1972. The highest-charting rendition of either version was by vocalist Andy Williams, who took "Speak Softly Love" to number 34 on Billboard magazine's Hot 100 and number seven on its Easy Listening chart.

Background

Larry Kusik wrote the original, English lyrics, and Nino Rota wrote the music, that was used in Fortunella, a 1958 Italian film directed by Eduardo De Filippo with script by Federico Fellini. Different sets of lyrics for the song were written in French (Parle plus bas), Italian (Parla più piano), Portuguese (Fale baixinho), Sicilian (Brucia la terra), and Spanish (Amor háblame dulcemente). Dalida sings the French version; the Sicilian version is sung by Anthony Corleone (Franc D'Ambrosio) in The Godfather Part III. It was first heard in America in 1969 on The Merv Griffin Show sung by Angela Bacari in English and Italian.

Awards
Rota's score for The Godfather had been nominated for a 1973 Academy Award for Best Original Score. However, it was disqualified from consideration when the academy learned Rota had used a more comedic version of the song for the film Fortunella (1958). Nonetheless, Rota's score for The Godfather Part II won the 1974 Academy Award for Best Score, despite the fact that it contained the same piece.

Chart performance
The first version of the song to reach any of the charts in Billboard magazine was "Love Theme from The Godfather" by pianist Roger Williams. His instrumental recording debuted in the issue dated 1 April 1972, and "bubbled under" the Hot 100 for five weeks, peaking at number 116, and another piano rendition by Ferrante and Teicher got as high as number 28 Easy Listening during its four-week chart run that began in the 8 April issue. The version that the film's music director, Carlo Savina, and his orchestra recorded for the soundtrack first charted on the Hot 100 in the 22 April issue and made it to number 66 during a nine-week chart run. It also reached number 24 on the Easy Listening chart during its three weeks there that began in the 20 May issue.

Charts (Love Theme)

"Speak Softly Love"

The Andy Williams version of "Speak Softly Love" also made its first appearance in the 8 April issue and reached number 34 on the Hot 100 during its 11 weeks there and number seven Easy Listening over the course of 12 weeks. A recording of the song by Al Martino debuted on both of those charts in the 29 April issue and peaked at number 80 during its four weeks on the Hot 100 and number 24 on the Easy Listening chart, where it also spent four weeks.

In the UK Williams began a run of nine weeks on 5 August of that year that led to a number 42 showing. In Spain, his version was a number-one hit, staying at the top of the charts for 15 weeks.

Charts (Speak Softly Love)

Recordings
 Slash of Guns N' Roses began performing instrumental guitar versions of the song as early as the late 1980s. The song is often referred to as "The Godfather Theme" and is included on his 2010 live album Live in Manchester and his 2011 live album Made in Stoke. A studio recording exists and was recorded for a rare 2002 soundtrack titled The Kid Stays in the Picture. 
A Ukrainian version, "Skazhy shcho liubysh" (lit. Say you love me) was performed by Sofia Rotaru in the musical film Song Is Always with Us (1975), as the Soviet administration did not allow her to record an English cover of The Godfathers theme following an offer from Ariola Records.
 James Booker included an instrumental version of the song on his album Classified.
 Jason Kouchak sang the original Italian version Parla più piano as a tribute.
 The melody was used as the theme music and as a central plot device in the Soviet short animated film Contact (1978).
 Bay Area rapper Mac Dre sampled the theme in his hip-hop song "Mafioso" from his album, Al Boo Boo (2003).
 Hip-hop artist RZA of Wu-Tang Clan samples the theme in "Black Mozart" on Raekwon's album Only Built 4 Cuban Linx... Pt. II (2009).
 A heavy metal cover of the song was done by the band Fantômas on their album The Director's Cut in 2001.
 Andrea Bocelli recorded the Sicilian version for his 2015 album Cinema.
 Gianni Morandi performs a version of song in Italian.
 Italian-French singer Dalida performed a French version of the song written by Boris Bergman in her 1972 album Il faut du temps.
 The Latino-Mediterranean band French Latino also performed the French version. in their album Guarda la esperanza.
 German singer Udo Lindenberg recorded a version with new German lyrics as the closing title track for his 2016 album Stärker als die Zeit.

See also
"Promise Me You'll Remember (Love Theme from The Godfather Part III)"

References

Bibliography

External links
 
 

1972 singles
Columbia Records singles
Paramount Records singles
Songs with lyrics by Larry Kusik
Andy Williams songs
Scott Walker (singer) songs
Love Theme From The Godfather
Love themes
Songs written for films
Film theme songs
Song recordings produced by Dick Glasser